William Ronald Dodds Fairbairn FRSE (11 August 1889 – 31 December 1964) was a Scottish psychiatrist, psychoanalyst and a central figure in the development of the Object Relations Theory of psychoanalysis. He usually used, and was known as and referred to as, "W. Ronald D. Fairbairn".

Life 

Ronald Fairbairn was born at the Red House, Cluny Gardens, in Morningside, Edinburgh in 1889, the only child of Cecilia Leefe and Thomas Fairbairn, a chartered surveyor, and President of the Edinburgh Architectural Association. He was educated at Merchiston Castle School and at the University of Edinburgh where he studied for three years in divinity and Hellenic Greek studies, graduating MA in 1911.

In the First World War he joined the Royal Engineers and served under General Allenby in the Palestinian campaign, and then the Royal Garrison Artillery.

On his return to home he began medical training, probably inspired by his war experience. He received a doctorate in Medicine (MD) on 30 March 1929 from the University of Edinburgh. From 1927 to 1935 he lectured in psychology at the University and also independently practised analysis. From 1941 until 1954 he was Consultant Psychiatrist to the Ministry of Pensions.

In 1931 he was elected a Fellow of the Royal Society of Edinburgh. His proposers were James Drever, Edwin Bramwell, Sir Godfrey Hilton Thomson and Robert Alexander Fleming.

On the basis of his writings he became an associate member of the British Psychoanalytical Society in 1931, becoming a full member in 1939. Fairbairn, though somewhat isolated in that he spent his entire career in Edinburgh, had a profound influence on British Object Relations and the relational schools. Fairbairn was one of the theory-builders for the Middle Group (now called the Independent Group) psychoanalysts. The Independent Group contained analysts who identified with neither the Kleinians nor the Anna Freudians. They were more concerned with the relationships between people than with the "drives" within them.

He died in Edinburgh at the age of 75. He is buried with his wives in Dean Cemetery in western Edinburgh. The grave lies very close to the main east entrance and lodge-house.

Family
In 1926 Fairbairn married Mary Ann More-Gordon (1901–1952) the daughter of Harry More-Gordon. Their daughter Ellinor was born in 1927, followed by twins in 1928, however they did not survive. Their fourth child was born in 1929, and in 1933 their fifth son Nicholas was born, who would go on to become a barrister and MP.

In 1959 he married Marion Frances Mackintosh (1907–1995), daughter of Captain H. E. M. Archer.

Work
Fairbairn's works include: Psychoanalytic Studies of the Personality (1952) and From Instinct to Self: Selected Papers of W. R. D. Fairbairn (1994). There is also a biography by John Derg Sutherland, Fairbairn’s Journey into the Interior (1989), and three books of collected papers on his work: including  James Grotstein and R. B. Rinsley, Fairbairn and the Origins of Object Relations (1994), an edited series of papers on Fairbairn's theory, Neil J. Skolnik's  and David E. Scharff, Fairbairn Then and Now (1998), and Clarke and Scharff's  Fairbairn and the Object Relations Tradition (2014). There are a number of texts dealing  directly with the application of Fairbairn's theory including Seinfeld's The Bad Object (1990)  a second text by Seinfeld  The Empty Core (1991),  a text by David Celani, The Treatment of the Borderline Patient: Applying Fairbairn's Object Relations Theory in the Clinical Setting 1993, a second text by Celani which is an application of Fairbairn's model to domestic violence, The Illusion of Love: Why the Battered Woman Returns to Her Abuser (1994), and a third  text by Celani on the application of Fairbairn's model to the treatment of severe personality disorders, Fairbairn's Object Relations Theory in the Clinical Setting (2010).

Psychoanalytic Studies of Personality (1952)
The importance of Fairbain's work lies both in its direct challenge to Freud's model of psychoanalysis, and as the origin of many fundamental concepts that are currently part of Object Relations Theory. Psychoanalytic Studies of Personality, a 1952 collection of Fairbairn's papers previously published in various psychoanalytic journals, includes four papers that contain most of his innovative concepts.

Fairbairn's model is classified as a psychoanalytic model or theory because it shares the common assumption of all psychoanalytic models—the belief that the fundamental source of human motivation originates in the unconscious—as well as offering explanations of the origins and dynamics of transference, repetition compulsions, and resistance. His enormously ambitious goal was to replace Freudian metapsychology with his own version of psychoanalysis. Fairbairn's vision of the human psyche was not one that was based on the Freudian notion that the infant is overflowing with primitive drives needing to be tamed, but rather that the infant is seeking love and emotional attachment that can infuse him with the security he needs to explore the world, safe in the knowledge that he has parents ready to help him if he becomes overwhelmed in that exploration. Fairbairn's model offers a different theory of psychological development, a completely new vision of the structure and dynamics of the personality, a different source of the origins of psychopathology, and finally, a different approach to the treatment of disordered individuals. Fairbairn's model also shifts the focus away from repression (of the Id's forbidden sexual and aggressive desires) and back to dissociation as the fundamental defense mechanism used by the human psyche.

Greenberg and Mitchell noted the basic changes promoted by Fairbairn:

In a series of dense and fertile papers written during the early 1940s, W. R. D. Fairbairn developed a theoretical perspective which, along with Sullivan's "interpersonal psychiatry", provides the purest and clearest expression of the shift from the drive/structure model to the relational/structure model
—Greenberg and Mitchell, 1983:151.

The psychoanalytic model Freud offers is a drive/structure model: it proposes that human beings are born with innate, biological drives (e.g., sexual desire and aggression) contained in the unconscious Id. The infant's Id seeks the discharge of its tensions regardless of the situation. When the discharging drive emerges as a behavior (hitting, biting, urinating, defecating) and comes into contact with the demands and prohibitions of society, there is immediate conflict. A new structure must emerge from the Id of the growing infant to insure that its drives are expressed in socially acceptable ways. Thus the unconscious Id—Freud's metaphor for the whole range of powerful biological drives—is forced to develop contact with reality through the emergence of a second structure: the Ego. Thus the Ego has the task of mediating between the primitive Id and society. Later on in development (via the Oedipal Conflict), the child internalizes the values of his parents. These internalized values become the third internal structure, which is called the Super Ego. These three hypothetical ego structures—Id, Ego, and Super Ego—mature and grow with experience. Freud postulated that all psychological development is based on the Id seeking satisfaction, the Ego curbing the Id's most extreme demands, and the Super Ego pressing the Ego to make morally correct choices.

In contrast, Fairbairn's is a relational/structure model in its assumption that the human psyche develops its structure from actual human experience, not from pressure from the Id, whose existence Fairbairn rejects. Instead, Fairbairn proposes that the human psyche develops structures based on actual interpersonal events. A child's growing and maturing internal ego structures can be understood as packages of memories that coalesce and form internal representations of the parents, of the child himself, and of the child's relationship to his parents. For Fairbairn, the unconscious develops as a consequence of empathic failures of the parents that are too disruptive for the child's underdeveloped central ego to tolerate. Awareness of these failures would interfere with the child's absolute dependency on his parents, and knowledge of them would destroy the necessary illusion that he is loved and cherished. In families where punishment is frequent and severe, parental failures can be catastrophic to the child's developing sense of self. That is, the child can be so overwhelmed by parental aggression that he faces the loss of his sense of self, as described by Bromberg:

Psychological trauma occurs in situations, explicitly or implicitly interpersonal, in which self-invalidation (sometimes self-annihilation) cannot be escaped from or prevented, and from which there is no hope of protection, relief, or soothing. If the experience is either prolonged, [sic] assaultively violent, or if self-development is weak or immature, then the level of affective arousal is too great for the event to be experienced self-reflectively and given meaning through cognitive processing. … At its extreme, the subjective experience is that of a chaotic and terrifying flooding of affect that threatens to overwhelm sanity and psychological survival
—Bromberg, 1998, 12.

Not all interpersonal trauma is as dramatic as Bromberg notes in the prior quote. Much developmental trauma accumulates gradually over time. The child's basic emotional and developmental needs include being talked to, being listened to, being respected as a person, and being helped when attempting difficult tasks. It is enough for the parent to simply ignore or discount the child over a long period of time for the child to assume that he/she is worthless, simply because he/she is simply not worth the parent's time. These small but daily traumas are called "cumulative trauma" as they convince the child that no one cares for him. The reality of the daily rejection of his emotional needs has to be dissociated.  Over time, these dissociated events, both the small daily events and those acute episodes during which the child's sense of self is endangered, coalesce and become ego structures in the individual's internal world. (See the following section on splitting of the ego for a detailed explanation of this process.) Thus the human psyche acquires structure from the split-off traumas that, if they were understood by the child, would destroy his needed dependency relationship with his parent. Thus they must be  dissociated and remain unavailable to the individual's conscious central ego. In Fairbairn's model the unconscious is not a biological inheritance of humankind,  but rather a conglomeration of memories of parental failures and interpersonal traumas that become internal structures- the building blocks of the human unconscious (see his 1943 paper).

"Schizoid Factors in the Personality" (1940)

In his first paper, Fairbairn observed that many of his patients seemed "schizoid", which he defined as any individual who showed evidence of having splits in their ego structure directly resulting from dissociated memories in their central ego. Today we would call these patients Personality Disordered. The dissociated packages of memories are held in the unconscious, "split-off" from the conscious central ego which no longer knows that they exist. Thus, many reality-based traumas are no longer known to the individual, who becomes withdrawn from interpersonal interactions because of the harshness he/she faces on a daily basis. Fairbairn defined the schizoid as having the three following characteristics:

... (1) an attitude of omnipotence, (2) an attitude of isolation and detachment and, (3) a preoccupation with inner reality.... So as far as the preoccupation with inner reality is concerned, this is undoubtedly the most important of all schizoid characteristics; and it is not the less present whether inner reality be substituted for outer reality, identified with outer reality, or superimposed upon outer reality
—Fairbairn, 1952, pp. 6–7.

The more frequently a child encounters intolerable trauma, the larger the number of memories of actual lived experiences that are split off and unavailable to the conscious "central ego". The schizoid style of relating (or more accurately, non-relating) to others originates from repeated rejections of the child's legitimate need for love and emotional support during his developmental years. The schizoid child was raised by a mother who was unable to relate to her child with tender, loving emotions, (or father, if he was the primary caretaker) and as a direct consequence of this rejection, the child withdraws into his inner world, which is safer, but is  ultimately less satisfying. Fairbairn spells this out starkly:

Regressive reinstatement of the early oral attitude (the earliest form of dependency) would appear to be most readily brought about by a situation of emotional frustration in which the child comes to feel (a) that he is not really loved for himself as a person by his mother, and (b) that his own love for his mother is not really valued and accepted by her. This is a highly traumatic situation, giving rise to a further situation characterized as follows: (a) the child comes to regard his mother as a Bad Object in so far as she does not seem to love him, (b) The child comes to regard outward expressions of his own love as bad, with the result that ... he tends to retain his love inside of himself. (c) The child comes to feel that love relationships with external objects in general are bad, or at least precarious
— Fairbairn, 1952:17–18.

Fairbairn recognized that lack of love in a young child's life is traumatic and disruptive to his attachment. In his later papers (1943 &1944),he observed that the child protected himself from remembering these traumatic events by using the dissociative defense to erase them from his conscious memory.

Fairbairn thought about, and wrote about the issue of the child's dependency on his mother in each of his four early papers as he was expanding his observations while creating a coherent model. For example, in the following quote from his next paper (1941) he observed that the repeated frustration of legitimate dependency needs was one of the causal factors leading to the schizoid personality style.He observed that the unloved child feels his love is destructive because his parents do not value or accept it, and because they do not return his love. Thus the child blames himself for not being lovable, which deflects the blame from his unloving parents on to himself. By blaming himself, he continues the illusion that he has loving parents that reject him for a good reason, i.e., that he and his love are toxic. This theme will come up again in the 1943 paper when Fairbairn described "The Moral Defense Against Bad Objects" which is a cognitive defense in which the child blames himself for his parents emotional and empathic failures. In the next quote, Fairbairn uses the Freudian concept of 'Libido', which was defined as the mix of sex and aggression in the Id which was invested in his parents or other family members. Fairbairn was forced to use the preexisting language of psychoanalysis, so he took the word "libido" and changed it to mean a child's love for his parents or love of other external objects.Despite this, he also uses the Freudian "energetic"  metaphor of "withdrawing libido", however over time he reduced his use of Freudian concepts and replaced them with his own.

It is the great tragedy of the schizoid individual that his love seems to destroy: and it is because his love seems so destructive that he experiences such difficulty in directing libido toward objects in outer reality. He becomes afraid to love: and therefore he erects barriers between his objects and himself. He tends to both keep his objects at a distance and to make himself remote from them. He rejects his objects: and at the same time he withdraws libido from them. This withdrawal of libido may be carried to all lengths. It may be carried to a point at which all emotional and physical contacts with other persons are renounced; and it may even go so far that all libidinal links with outer reality are surrendered, all interest in the world around fades and everything becomes meaningless. In proportion as libido is withdrawn from outer objects it is directed toward internalized objects: and in proportion as this happens the person becomes introverted (Fairbairn 1952, p. 50).

Simply put, the unloved child who has directed his love toward his parents, only to be rebuffed, gives up hope that he will ever be loved, and as a consequence holds his love inside. He gives up on human relationships, focusing instead on his inner world with its fantasies and dreams of success.

"A Revised Psychopathology of the Psychoses and Psychoneuroses" (1941) 
Fairbairn was gradually forming his model in these first papers. He challenged Freud's drive theory directly in this second paper by stating "Nevertheless, it would appear as if the point had now been reached at which, in the interest of progress, the classical libido theory would have to be transformed into "a theory of development based essentially upon object-relationships" (Fairbairn 1952, p. 31).  The shift in focus from drive theory to object relations theory in the 1940s was far too great for the psychoanalytic community to accept, because Freud's entire model was based on the assumption that human psyche was powered by the activity of libidinal drives. All of psychoanalysis was Freudian in the 1940s, there were no other options, and yet Fairbairn asked his colleagues to choose between his model and Freud's. They overwhelming chose Freud. From this point on, his model was seen as an "interesting philosophical and intellectual exercise", rather than as a viable analytic model that would, over time, become one of the foundational models of "Relational Psychoanalysis" or simply "Relationality". Fairbairn proposed an outline of a developmental model in his 1941 paper as well. He noted that human development was characterized by a gradual differentiation (separation both physically and psychologically) from the parent because of the emergence of a constantly maturing, reality oriented "central ego" in the young adult. This allows the young adult to begin life on his own, find a partner and produce the next generation.

The development of object-relationships is essentially a process whereby infantile dependence upon the object gradually gives place to mature dependence upon the object. The process of development is characterized (a) by the gradual abandonment of an original object relationship based on primary identification, and (b) the gradual adoption of an object-relationship based upon differentiation of the object
— Fairbairn, 1952, p. 34

Thus, as the infant develops he/she gradually realizes that he/she is not part of his mother, but rather is an independent, functioning person. Unfortunately, many children are not supported and loved sufficiently to go through the "transitional" stage easily. They do not feel secure and cannot engage in age appropriate activity with their peers. Instead, they are stuck, looking backwards toward their mother for more support, rather than toward the outside world of other children and healthy play. Fairbairn noted this in one of his most famous quotes:

The greatest need of a child is to obtain conclusive assurance (a) that he is genuinely loved as a person by his parents, and (b) that his parents genuinely accept his love. It is only in so far as such assurance is forthcoming in a form sufficiently convincing to enable him to depend safely upon his real objects (parents) that he is able to gradually renounce infantile dependence without misgiving. In the absence of such assurance his relationships to his objects is fraught with too much anxiety over separation to enable him to renounce the attitude of infantile dependence: for such a renunciation would be equivalent in his eyes to forfeiting all hope of ever obtaining the satisfaction of his unsatisfied emotional needs. Frustration of his desire to be loved as a person, and frustration of his desire to have his love accepted, is the greatest trauma that a child can experience
— Fairbairn, 1952, pp. 39–40

The loved child does receive support and encouragement which gives him enough courage to let his parents go temporarily, while focusing on the establishment of new relationships with peers and future partners. Conversely, the dependent child cannot mature and go on to the next developmental step as he is fearful of increased separation from his parents without being sure of their love and support.The child who is unsure of his parents' love remains emotionally underdeveloped, and often remains at home, trying to obtain the love that was not forthcoming in his developmental history (Celani, 2005).

The unloved child attempts to avoid further emotional rebuffs by becoming increasingly "schizoid". That is, he turns away from the harsh and unloving world of his family and towards his internalized memories of others, including his parents, for reassurance that they are with him and available at all times. Unfortunately, most of his internalized memories are negative (see the relationship between the Antilibidinal Ego and the Rejecting Object in the Splitting section). Despite the negativity, the endless struggle between these internalized split off part self and part object provides the comfort of the known and familiar.In addition, these inner world interpersonal dramas are always available as a substitute to the harshness of external reality.  Clearly, this is a half measure, but it is the best that the ignored or rejected child can do under the circumstances, as he cannot change his parents or force them to love him.

Secondly, the rejected child comforts himself with "substitutive satisfactions" which Fairbairn assumed were forms of immature sexuality. Today, the unloved, schizoid child has only to turn to the internet for an endless number of fantasy based videos that compensate him for his lack of love, lack of power, and his desire for revenge, which temporarily lessens his pain. Fairbairn was clear about this regressive return to the inner world because of the harshness of the external world: "Fundamentally, these substitutive satisfactions ...all represent relationships with internalized objects, to which the individual is compelled to turn in default of satisfactory relationships with objects in the outer world"(Italics in the original) Fairbairn, 1952, p. 40). This far reaching observation of Fairbairn's has been validated by the millions of alienated and unloved children who spend hour upon hour avoiding interactions with external reality, including their family members, while immersed in their video fantasy world. This is the most satisfaction that they can get from their lives, as their relationships with their parents are so frustrating.

Fairbairn also discussed the difficulties in separating from unloving parents in this 1941 paper. He recognized that the lack of early support left the child with very few emotional resources to sustain himself when he left home and faced the world alone. He called the stage between "infantile dependence" and "mature interdependence' the stage of "Transition".

The great conflict of the transition stage may now be formulated as a conflict between a progressive urge to surrender the infantile attitude of identification with the object and a regressive urge to maintain that attitude. During this period, accordingly, the behavior of the individual is characterized both by desperate endeavors on his part to separate from the object and desperate endeavors to achieve reunion with the object-desperate attempts "to escape from prison' and desperate attempts "to return home.) (Fairbairn, 1952, p. 43).

The less the child has been supported in his early years, the less chance he/she has of a successful transition into adulthood. The huge number of "adult" aged individuals who either live at home with their aging parents, or others who live separately, but remain fixated in an adolescent time warp, is enormous. In either case, they have been unable to enter mature relationships because they are still immature, withdrawn and fixated on their rejecting parent, forever seeking the support and encouragement that they missed out on in childhood (Celani, 2005).

"The Repression and the Return of Bad Objects" (1943) 
Fairbairn's third theoretical paper further alienated those few members of the analytic community who found his work acceptable as he had the temerity to once again urge the replacement of drive theory with his object relations theory.

Amongst the conclusions formulated in the above mentioned paper (his 1941 paper) two of the most far reaching are the following:(1) that libidinal "aims" are of secondary importance in comparison with object-relationships and (2) that a relationship with the object, and not gratification of the impulse, is the ultimate aim of libidinal striving (Fairbairn, 1952, p. 60).

Later on, in the same paper, Fairbairn added another comment that further alienated his analytic colleagues:

A point has now been reached at which the theory (Freud's Libido theory) has outworn its usefulness and, so far from providing impetus for further progress within the field of psychoanalytical thought, is actually operating as a brake upon the wheels (Fairbairn, 1952, p. 72).

This is not what the analytic community was looking for in 1943, as Fairbairn reduced the importance of libido to a secondary position as he described his unique vision of the child's motivation. He saw that all children sought out good objects, in the hope of establishing a loving relationship with another human being. He then formally re-defined the human unconscious, not as a container of biological drives, but rather as a compendium of memories of interpersonal events that were too destructive to the child's attachment to his parents for his developing ego to accept. Fairbairn's "challenge" of the Freudian model did not pose a problem for the analytic community, despite the fact that Fairbairn's unconscious was so different from the "standard" Freudian view, simply because his model was politely ignored for forty years until 1983, with the publication of Greenberg and Mitchell's book "Object Relations in Psychoanalytic Theory",. This alerted the younger members of the psychoanalytic community to the existence of  Fairbairn's theory of psychoanalysis, and the renewed interest provoked numerous publications.

I now venture to formulate the view that what are primarily repressed are neither intolerably guilty impulses nor intolerably unpleasant memories, but intolerably bad internalized objects. If memories are repressed, accordingly, this is only because the objects involved in such memories are identified with bad internalized objects (Fairbairn, 1952, p. 62).

This assertion by Fairbairn: that the unconscious is composed of dissociated memories of parental failures was simply too much for the analytic community to bear. He dismissed Freud's notion of an unconscious populated by biological forces that were seen to be (at that time) the fundamental motivator of humankind. In Fairbairn's model, the dissociated memories in the unconscious resonate throughout the individual's life. Note that Fairbairn was ahead of himself in this quote because he had not yet defined a "bad object", which is a parent or guardian that the child looks to for love, help, guidance, and support, and who fails the child again and again. Also note that Fairbairn uses the word repressed rather than dissociated in this quote. Repression is used to describe the psychological defense of holding of material in the unconscious that is already present. Dissociation describes the psychological act of actively "forgetting" an overwhelmingly traumatic event that occurred in the external world, and instantaneously forcing it into the unconscious. Once the memory of the event is there it is held out of awareness by repression.

Fairbairn's 1943 paper offered the reader a logical pathway for dissociated memories of neglect and abuse to become the foundation of the human unconscious and the seeds of adult psychopathology in the following passage.

Whether any given individual becomes delinquent, psychoneurotic, psychotic or simply "normal" would appear to depend in the main upon the operation of three factors: (1) the extent to which bad objects have been installed in the unconscious, and the degree of badness by which they are characterized, (2) the extent to which the ego is identified with internalized bad objects, and (3) the nature and strength of the defenses which protect the ego from these objects (Fairbairn, 1952, p. 65).

The child who is so unfortunate to be born in a family where the parents are absent, indifferent or abusive is going to experience and internalize a huge number of bad object interactions. A "Bad Object Interaction" is an event or interaction in which the child's needs are ignored or his dignity as a child is violated by parental indifference or cruelty. These dissociated memories coalesce and form large and powerful inner structures that will influence his view of himself and his perception of external reality. The second point in the quote describes how the individual's identification with the abuser can exacerbate the impact of the dissociated memories. For instance a boy who sees his father beat his mother may identify with this behavior and then re-enact this pattern in his adulthood. Conversely a female child might dis-identify with her father and, in adulthood, support abused women. The third factor, "Defensiveness" is also significant as the highly defended individual will remember little or nothing of the traumas he/she experienced in childhood. As a consequence, these individuals have a greater probability of re-enacting one role or the other (the abuser or the victim) because they have no ability to "mentalize", or think about and process the traumatic events of their childhood. Thus, the highly defended individual will never comprehend what actually happened to them, and realize how their early history influenced their adulthood. Instead, the internalized patterns will re-emerge and be acted out with the next generation. This is called the "intergenerational transmission of trauma".

Fairbairn also noticed that children who had been removed from their families because of extreme neglect or abuse (this was in Scotland during the 1930s) made endless excuses for their parents and assumed that they themselves were responsible for the treatment that they were receiving. That is, they convinced themselves that their parents were punishing them because they were dirty, disobedient, or lazy. The child assumed that he/she was the cause of the parent's hostile behavior toward them. Fairbairn called this the "Moral Defense Against Bad Objects". Once again the child is desperate to support his/her illusion that he/she is living within a loving family, and that he/she is the cause of the strife.

It becomes obvious, therefore, that the child would rather be bad himself than have bad objects: and accordingly we have some justification for surmising that one of his motives in becoming bad is to make his objects "good". In becoming bad he is really taking upon himself the burden of badness which appears to reside in his objects. By this means he seeks to purge them of his badness: and in proportion as he succeeds in doing so, he is rewarded by that sense of security which an environment of good objects so characteristically confers....Outer security is thus purchased at the price of inner insecurity (Fairbairn, 1952, p. 65).

This defense is a cognitive defense in that the child is using logic to explain to himself why he is being punished or neglected. By saying it is his fault, he absolves his parents and gives them a "good" reason for treating him badly. As Fairbairn notes, it continues the pattern used by children to support the illusion that they are living in a loving family. The child prefers to believe that he has a "moral" defect, such as being lazy, disrespectful, or being chronically dirty, all of which are potentially correctable, than see that his parents are, in reality,  emotionally bankrupt and indifferent to his welfare. Worse, the defensive self-blame erodes what little self-worth the child may have developed. This defense is really a precursor to the splitting defense that Fairbairn described in his next paper (1944), in that it is a primitive form of splitting in that the parental objects are "all good", and the child himself is "all bad". Fairbairn never went back to his earlier concepts, like the moral defense, and updated them to fit in with his evolving thought.

Then Fairbairn returned to his earlier discussion, that he had begun in his 1940 and 1941 papers, on different aspects of the child's dependency on his objects. These concepts would have been more appropriate in his earlier papers where he first discussed the issue of dependency. However, the reader is given an opportunity to actually see how a major innovator of a psychoanalytic theory gradually creates a model. His mind was not linear, and many topics came to mind again and again, dependency being the most frequent topic. Here he observes the intense need of the child for his parents and the child's inability to reject them, regardless of how badly he/she was being treated:

The child not only internalizes his bad objects because they force themselves upon him and he seeks to control them, but also, and above all, because he needs them. If a child's parents are bad objects, he cannot eject them, even if they do not force themselves upon him: for he cannot do without them. Even if they neglect him, he cannot reject them: for if they neglect him, his need for them is increased (Fairbairn, 1952, p. 67).

Fairbairn made this revolutionary observation and, at the time, it went unnoticed. The neglected child needs the parent more, rather than less because the individual's earlier needs were never fulfilled, and they do not suddenly disappear or resolve themselves. This observation seems counter-intuitive when seen from an adult perspective, because a mature individual would leave a hostile or unloving interpersonal situation in a minute.  However, the reality of many young adults from neglectful families is that their own unmet dependency needs pressure them to remain with their abusive parents.They may have unmet needs from age 4, 5, 6, 7, 8 (and so on) that were never met, so as a young adult this individual has no possibility whatsoever of separating from his neglectful parents, and beginning a life of his own. Their unmet dependency needs have prevented them from passing through the normal developmental steps, and they are completely unprepared to work for others, tolerate demands placed on them, interact with new people, and participate cooperatively. This was one of Fairbairn's great insights which can be seen in virtually all young patients.

Fairbairn then took up new topics in the same wide-ranging paper- which is one of his two greatest (the second being his 1944 paper, which will be described in the next section). The two topics were (1) his theory of treatment and (2) his view of resistance. Most of his work focuses on the Bad Object, and the many psychological problems it fostered. In this section of the paper he begins to think about the positive impact of a Good Object- one that fulfills the promise of being nurturing, loving, and supportive. As mentioned earlier, Fairbairn's model is symmetrical, in that good objects which are available and conscious (and which ideally should be present in every child's life) have the opposite effect as compared to bad objects. Here he notes that they can actually cure or at least mitigate, the effects of internalized bad objects.

Nevertheless, I cannot help feeling that such results must be attributed, in part at least, to the fact that in the transference situation the patient is provided in reality with an unwontedly good object, and is thereby placed in a position to risk a release of his internalized bad objects from the unconscious and so to provide conditions for the libidinal cathexis of these objects to be dissolved--albeit he is also under a temptation to exploit a "good" relationship with the analyst, as a defense against taking this risk (Fairbairn, 1952, p. 69).

Fairbairn identifies one of the key mutative factors in psychotherapy as the "good relationship" between the therapist and patient. The influence of a good object therapist should provoke a derepression (a release from the unconscious) of the memories of abuse and neglect that were previously unavailable to his conscious central ego. He sees the relationship between patient and therapist as providing the patient with enough confidence and support to allow him to "remember" what actually happened to him, as he has a new object upon whom he can depend.  Fairbairn uses the word "libidinal cathexis" in his quote which is a holdover from the Freudian model. It means emotional investment of libidinal energy in the other person, which when translated into Fairbairn's terminology, means emotional attachment. Thus a relationship with a new, good object can loosen up the attachment to an internalized bad object, as the good object offers the patient an alternative attachment. In reality, this process happens after treatment is well underway. At the outset of treatment most patients stubbornly cling to their illusions that they were raised in a loving and supportive family as well as to the illusion that they are somehow defective and deserving of neglect or abuse.

Resistance to Treatment Based on the Toxicity of the Internalized Bad Objects 
The 1943 paper's title "Repression and the Return of Bad Objects" suggests that Fairbairn was going to address the reemergence of bad objects, which he does in his observation regarding one of the fundamental sources of Resistance. The prior quote on the effects of a good object as a catalyst to de-repression of the internalized toxic memories did not take resistance into account. Resistance describes the patient's attempts to remain the same and fight against the therapist's interventions during the process of psychotherapy, despite their conscious desire to change. As previously noted, Fairbairn's model is coherent, and given that the source of psychopathology is the internalization of bad objects because they were intolerable to accept, resistance comes from the patient's fear of acknowledging and accepting what happened to him in childhood despite the fact that these events occurred decades ago. This is true even if the parents are long deceased, because for the patient to accept what they did to him/her as a child demands that he/she will have to revisit and re-experience many of the rejecting experiences he/she lived through. This will, in turn, destroy the illusions that he/she constructed about their parents and the "goodness" of his/her childhood. It also leaves the individual without a personal history, as he has to give up all his fantasies of being a member of a family and instead, see himself as an unloved and discarded child. For a detailed description of how to manage patient resistance during the process of treatment see Celani, 2010 (pp,117-184).

Fairbairn's quote on resistance is graphic and to the point.

There is little doubt in my mind that, in conjunction with another factor to be mentioned later, the deepest source of resistance is fear of the release of bad objects from the unconscious: for when such bad objects are released, the world around the patient becomes peopled with devils which are too terrifying for him to face...At the same time there is now little doubt in my mind that the release of bad objects from the unconscious is one of the chief aims which the psychotherapist should set himself out to achieve, even at the expense of a severe "transference neurosis": for it is only when the internalized bad objects are released from the unconscious that there is any hope of their cathexis being dissolved. The bad objects can only be safely released, however, if the analyst has become established as a sufficiently good object for the patient. Otherwise the resulting insecurity may prove insupportable (Fairbairn, 1952, pp. 69–70).

Fairbairn's clinical observation regarding the difficulty for patients to actually reexamine and tolerate the events that they had already suffered through, is absolutely correct. Exposure of the patient to the realities of his childhood can only be successfully managed when the patient is securely attached to the therapist as a good object, and thus will not feel abandoned when the illusions about his parents fall away. Fairbairn was both a philosopher and an advanced divinity student before becoming a physician and psychoanalyst, and often his language involves devils and angels, as it does in this quote. Later on the next page he ends his comment on resistance with the statement: "It becomes evident, accordingly, that the psychotherapist is the true successor to the exorcist, and that he is concerned, not only with "the forgiveness of sins", but also with "the casting out of devils" (Fairbairn, 1952, p. 70). Thus he equates bad internalized objects with devils, who tempt the individual to follow self-destructive paths. Specifically, when an unloved child or adolescent tries to force love out of an unloving parent, or conversely, when he demands that a rejecting parent learns to appreciate and value him, both exemplify  self- destructive attachments.

Endopsychic Structure Considered in terms of Object Relationships (1944) 

Fairbairn, as mentioned, was continually amplifying and refining his observations regarding children's dependency on their parents. This was also true for his 1944 paper, which contains a detailed description of the impossible dilemma that the rejected child faces. Here, he highlights the crushing emotionality experienced by the child when his needs are rejected, and the impossibly frustrating position he is forced into, one in which he cannot complain about his rejection for fear of increased rejection while simultaneously he cannot express his love or his need. The following quote demonstrates Fairbairn's writing at its best along with his unparalleled sensitivity to children's needs.

From the latter standpoint, what he experiences is a sense of lack of love, and indeed of emotional rejection on his mother's part. This being so, the expression of hate toward her as a rejecting object becomes in his eyes a very dangerous procedure. On the one hand, it is calculated to make her reject him all the more, and thus increase her badness and make her seem more real in her capacity as a bad object. On the other hand it is calculated to make her love him less, and thus to decrease her "goodness' and make her seem less real (ie: destroy her) in her capacity of a good object. At the same time it also becomes a dangerous procedure for the child to express his libidinal need, i.e.his nascent love, of his mother in the face of rejection at her hands...In an older child this experience (showing love to a parent and having it rejected) is one of intense humiliation over the depreciation of his love, which seems to be involved. At a somewhat deeper level, or at an earlier stage, the experience is one of shame over the display of needs which are disregarded or belittled. In virtue of these experiences of humiliation and shame he feels reduced to a state of worthlessness, destitution or beggardom. His sense of his own value is threatened: and he feels bad in the sense of "inferior (Fairbairn, 1952, pp. 112–113).

Thus the child can neither complain about his treatment for fear that he will be treated even more horribly, nor does he dare to offer his love to a parent who might reject and belittle him, as he has experienced in the past. The child has nowhere to go and no one from whom he can seek help or appeal to, which is the position that millions of children are caught in at any given moment in time. Fairbairn gained his many insights to the plight of children from his work in the orphanage attached to the hospital in Edinburgh in which he worked (1927–1935), and he never forgot those experiences.

An Outline of Fairbairn's Structural Model 
Fairbairn's 1944 paper introduced the psychoanalytic community to his alternative view of the structure of the human personality which he saw as being the result of dissociation of intolerably frustrating experiences with the individuals parents. Before he introduced his model he commented on the ability of one structure (or sub-self) to repress another sub-self, and in so doing, become the executive (dominant) ego structure.

It is not inconceivable that one part of the "ego" with a dynamic charge should repress another part of the "ego" with a dynamic charge..In order to account for repression, we thus appear to be driven to the necessity of assuming a certain multiplicity of egos (Fairbairn, 1952, p. 90).

The ability of one ego state to repress another ego state is the central dynamic of the unconscious in Fairbairn's model. It accounts for the shifting of ego states (or self-states) that can occur when for instance, the central ego interacts with someone who resembles (or seems to resemble) the rejecting object of their childhood. The central ego is instantly repressed and the angry, combative antilibidinal ego reappears, and becomes the dominant or "executive ego". His whole mood and experience of the world shifts and he is ready to defend himself and taunt the more powerful rejecting object. Conversely the central ego may be replaced by the libidinal ego if someone in his environment promises praise and advancement (or he imagines this to be so), and he begins to slavishly seek the individuals approbation. Fairbairn saw psychopathology as an endless series of shifting ego states which were originally designed to protect the individual from the harsh realities of their childhood, but in adulthood they disrupt the individual because of the incomplete views of themselves and the incomplete views of people around them.

Fairbairn's 1944 structural theory emerged from his careful and detailed analysis of a patient's dream (Fairbairn, 1952, pp. 95–106). He observed that the patient had separate views of herself and of her significant others that could be understood as part-selves and part objects. Fairbairn saw that there were three pairs of structures- one pair was conscious and the other two pairs were largely unconscious.The fundamental position of Object Relations Theory is that for every developing self there has to be a object to whom it relates, thus every pair of structures contains a version of self paired with a version of the object (other person) to whom the self structure was relating. The two conscious structures are The Central Ego (the self structure) and its relationship to the Ideal Object (the "good object" other), and two pairs of unconscious structures. The first pair of (mostly unconscious structures) are The Antilibidinal Ego (the self structure, which Fairbairn originally called the "internal saboteur") is an internal representation of the neglected, humiliated and enraged child in a relationship to the Rejecting Object, (the object structure) which is an internal representation of the abusive parent. The second pair of unconscious structures are The Libidinal Ego (the self structure) which is the child's fantasy of the good parent whom he wishes for and his relationship to the Exciting Object (the object structure) which is a fantasy representation of the loving parent who offers him hope for the future.  In Fairbairn's model the need of the child for a positive parent is so intense that the deprived child creates a "good" parent out of fantasy and hope.  This second vision of the parent (mis)perceives the parent as filled with the potential of love. This vision of the parent is built out of the occasional positive or tender interaction that the child has experienced with his mostly rejecting parents.  The attachments of these two mostly unconscious selves to these part objects constitutes what Fairbairn defined as an attachment to the Bad Object.  The Bad Object has two facets: the antilibidinal ego argues with and complains about its mistreatment to the rejecting object in an attempt to reform it, while the libidinal ego seeks ways to find out how to please the exciting object which promises it love which is always out of reach. Neither part-self (antilibidinal ego, libidinal ego) is willing to give up their quest, and neither part object (rejecting object and exciting object) is willing to concede defeat, and neither of the object representations (rejecting or exciting) is willing to give either of the child's two selves any satisfaction.

Dissociation and the Splitting of the Ego 

Prior to Fairbairn, the defense of dissociation was seen as an extreme defense that was only used in life-threatening situations. Fairbairn's work in an orphanage convinced him that children separated from their families had experienced a major trauma that required the dissociative defense to prevent a complete psychic collapse. The dissociative defense erased the intolerable rejecting event from their consciousness. The memory of the abandonment along with the memory of the parents reasons for their actions are forced into the unconscious and held there by repression. This allows the abandoned child to continue loving a parent that he/she sees as completely supportive.  In families where rejection is commonplace, the thousands upon thousands of dissociated memories accrue and become powerful sub-personalities. Memories of the angry, annoyed, rejecting or indifferent parent coalesce in the child's unconscious and become a single representation of the angry parent already described as the rejecting object. The child must also dissociate memories of himself during the interpersonally rejecting interactions into the antilibidinal ego. These memories of the child's self as suffused with fear, defeat, shame and humiliation that cannot be tolerated consciously. The Splitting Defense allows the child to hate the rejecting object with a feral rage, and to love the exciting object with all its heart. Splitting is a defense that prevents the integration of Good and Bad Object memories into a single whole object. Thus, the individual never develops "object constancy" which is the ability to see a person's goodness, even when they are being rejected or frustrated by that person. This dual vision (that the individual is both loving and at other times, rejecting) of an outside object is called ambivalence Thus, a very important developmental milestone is not achieved, and the individual functions at an earlier stage of psychological development, often throughout life. Splitting causes the individual to respond to external objects as if they were two different people. Each split off object is only part of the actual parent and these separate and often opposite views of the object are called Part Objects. When the individual is frustrated they see the object as "all bad" and devoid of any goodness. Conversely, when they are dominated by their libidinal ego structure they see the object as "all good". This style of relating to the world defines the Borderline Personality disorder (Celani, 1993, 2010). Fairbairn described this shift in ego states in the earlier quote that addressed the fact that one ego state could repress another ego state, resulting in a person who experiences the world through a "multiplicity of egos". Developmentally, this is equivalent to the child who screams at her mother in a rage, and moments later says "I love you, Mommy". The dominant ego state has no awareness of the other ego state which has just been repressed. Equally importantly, powerful, emotion filled memories are dissociated, which impoverishes and weakens the central ego, which is unaware of significant realities from its developmental history, and is unable to hold onto a single view of their interpersonal world, (Celani, 2005, Celani, 2010).

Resistance Based on the Two Sub Egos' Attachments to Their Respective Part-Objects 
The reality that Fairbairn's structural theory contains six different structures is a source of difficulty in terms of its adoption by the analytic community, as it is more complex than Freud's three structure theory. It also forces the user to think in terms of self and object, rather that the individual in isolation. This model represents a whole new vision of the psychological functioning of the human personality, which is very different from the original Libido Theory. Fairbairn's model is one of relationships in which there are constant dialogues between the structures. That is, the relational pattern that was internalized during childhood includes typical dialogues that were originally experienced in the external world, but now continue in the internal world. For example the antagonistic and bickering relationship between the antilibidinal ego and the internalized rejecting object continues unabated in dialogues between them, as described by Ogden.Note in this quote how Odgen emphasizes the deep emotional attachment that motivates each structure to maintain their position during the ongoing internal dialogue.

Neither the rejecting object nor the internal saboteur (the antilibidinal ego) is willing or able to think about, much less relinquish, that tie. In fact, there is no desire on the part of either to change anything about their mutual dependence. The power of that bond is impossible to overestimate. The rejecting object and the internal saboteur are determined to nurse their feelings of having been deeply wronged, cheated, humiliated, betrayed, exploited, treated unfairly, discriminated against, and so on. The mistreatment at the hands of the other is felt to be unforgivable. An apology is forever expected by each, but never offered by either (Odgen, 2010, p. 109).

Fairbairn's first quote on source of resistance that he discussed in the 1943 paper, regarding the de-repression of internalized objects creating a frightening world "peopled with devils", mentions "another factor" which create resistance, which he discussed in this (1944) paper. This second factor is the intense attachment between the libidinal ego and its exciting object, which is an attachment that is fueled by need and unfulfilled desire, and is described in the following quote. As noted, there is an equally fierce bond between the antilibidinal ego and the rejecting object, as described in the prior quote by Odgen. Fairbairn observed that the libidinal ego of the neglected child lives in a world of hopeful fantasies and he/she cannot give up hope in their parents because his/her entire world would crash down upon them if he/she were to accept that indeed, there was no hope.

There can be no room for doubt that the obstinate attachment of the libidinal ego to the exciting object and its reluctance to renounce this object constitute a particularly formidable source of resistance—and one which plays no small part in determining what is known as the negative therapeutic reaction...The truth is that, however well the fact may be disguised, the individual is extremely reluctant to abandon his original hate, no less than his original need of his original objects in childhood (Fairbairn, 1952, p. 117).

As already described, the attachment between the two split off sub-egos and their respective objects defines the attachment to the bad object. Fairbairn uses the concept of "Negative Therapeutic Reaction" in this quote, which is defined as a hostile reaction by a patient to treatment regardless of the skill or experience of the therapist. Patient's who are deeply involved in their inner world, and who are re-fighting all the battles of their childhood, will not tolerate any interference in their ongoing battles and will experience the therapist as an unwelcome intruder. These two quotes demonstrate that resistance to change is fueled by both sub-egos in the inner world. The antilibidinal ego does not want to give up its quest to reform the rejecting object's view of him, while the libidinal ego refuses to give up on the fantasy that there is still some hidden love in his objects. Clinically, if the inexperienced therapist insists at the outset of treatment that the patient separate from his/her parents and live on their own, he/she might precipitate an abandonment crisis that may endanger further treatment. The patient needs a secure attachment to an external object before any of these internal ties can be given up. Once again, Fairbairn's model is consistent and logical in that the original source of psychopathology is the internalization of bad objects. Once internalized, the original motives of the sub egos continue to operate in the inner world as they struggle with the two internalized objects.. When this factor is combined with the earlier description of resistance as coming from the patients fear of the powerful emotions associated with the de-repression of internalized bad objects, coupled with the emotional loss of all of his fantasies about belonging to a family, resistance becomes completely understandable.

The Variable Strength of the Ego Structures 
Fairbairn's structural model is the beginning stage of a multiple personality, however it never develops beyond this steady state. As described, the central ego develops in relationship to the supportive and nurturing parent(s), the Ideal Object(s). The strength and size of the Central Ego varies from child to child according to how many positive, ego enhancing activities and interpersonal events they have experienced with their parents during the course of their development. Fairbairn's model assumes that actual events in the external world are internalized and summate in both the conscious central ego and in the unconscious structures as well. Thus large numbers of loving, non-intrusive, and emotionally supportive interactions with the parent(s) enhance the child's central ego through daily positive relating. As the child develops over time his trust in others allows him/her to interact with peers and adults and he/she is able to develop new skills, as well as enlarge a more complex view of himself/herself through interactions with others.

In less favorable developmental conditions, where support, nurturance and reassurance is scarce or absent, the child's central ego does not develop a richer and more rounded sense of self, rather the development of his central ego is thwarted rather than enhanced. The developing child's focus is on the neglectful parents in the hopes of positive, supportive responses. At the same time, his many negative experiences have been first dissociated and then held in the unconscious by repression. In the process, his central ego has lost sight of the many important (but negative) events in his childhood, which are banished (and remain) in his unconscious structures.  The ratio of conscious to unconscious structures shifts away from conscious relationships with external objects to the child's powerful and richly populated unconscious, with the endless bickering between the antilibidinal ego and the rejecting object, and the unrealistic fantasy world of the libidinal ego. A powerful unconscious that is filled with constant dialogues influences the weakened central ego which interprets all of reality in terms of the rigid role-relationships that are active in his unconscious. These internal templates cloud reality and become the source of both transference and repetition compulsions (Celani, 2010).

A Structural Analysis of the Effects of Treatment 
Fairbairn's 1944 paper also gave a brief description the impact of psychotherapy or psychoanalysis on the patient's interior world. In the following quote, Fairbairn speaks of "territories", which is his physical metaphor for the size of the internal structures. He sees the effects of psychotherapy as decreasing the two sub-egos because the central ego develops strength due to its acceptance of the therapist as a good and reliable object, and it can now tolerate some or most of the painful realities of his/her childhood.

I conceive it as one of the chief aims of psychoanalytical therapy to introduce some change into its topography by way of territorial adjustment. Thus I conceive it as among the most important functions of psychoanalytical therapy (a) to reduce the split of the original ego by restoring to the central ego a maximum of the territories ceded to the libidinal ego and the internal saboteur (the antilibidinal ego), and (b) to bring the exciting object and the rejecting object so far as possible together within the sphere and influence of the central ego (Fairbairn, 1952, pp. 129–130).

The diminished central ego is easily influenced by the unconscious split off beliefs and assumptions of the sub egos, which can suddenly repress the central ego and become the conscious executive ego for a period of time (a multiplicity of egos). This makes the individual appear erratic (which indeed they are) and causes others with whom they relate to abandon them as they are so changeable and unreliable. Fairbairn saw treatment as gradually allowing the central ego to grow as it learns of, and accepts the truth of what happened to him/her as a child. For the first time, the pain, anger and hostility of the antilibidinal ego will now make sense to the central ego given that the patient can now access more memories of the rejecting parents. Secondly, his libidinal ego will also lose some of its psychic "territory", to use Fairbairn's metaphor, as the patient's illusions about his parents are scrutinized in treatment.  His/her fantasy based illusions are based on his libidinal ego not-knowing just how bad the rejecting object(s) once were (the libidinal ego does not know that the rejecting object even exists). All the previously dissociated information has to come through the central ego, and once the central ego "knows" and accepts what happened to him/her in childhood, the sub-egos lose all their power. Given that the central ego now knows about the rejecting object, there is no place for an illusory fantasy about the parents assumed, hidden package of  love.

"On the Nature and Aims of Psycho-analytical Treatment" (1958) 
Fairbairn focused on treatment in this 1958 paper that was published six years after his 1952 book of collected papers. Fairbairn was extremely courageous intellectually as he had directly challenged the highly regarded creator of psychoanalysis, Sigmund Freud. In this first quote, which completely sealed his theory's fate as an outlier in relation to "classical" psychoanalysis, Fairbairn cites the differences between his model and Freud's.

In brief, my theoretical position may be said to be characterized by four main conceptual formulations-viz.(a) a theory of dynamic psychical structure, (b) a theory to the effect that libidinal activity is inherently and primarily object seeking, (c) a resulting theory of libidinal development couched, not in terms of presumptive zonal dominance, but in terms of the quality of dependence, and (d) a theory of the personality couched exclusively in terms of internal object relationships. The first two of these formulations taken in combination may be said to represent a substitute for two of Freud's basic theories- his classic libido theory and his final theory of instincts. The third formulation is offered as a revision of Abraham's version of Freud's theory of libidinal development. And, finally, my object relations theory of the personality is intended to replace Freud's description of the mental constitution in terms of the id, the ego and the superego(Fairbairn, 1958, p.374).

This summary quote consigned the study of Fairbairn's work to those few scholars who were interested in the development of analytic concepts, but it was completely ignored my mainstream practitioners of the craft. He had taken on the entire world of psychoanalysis and presented an alternative reality, one that was simply too different to be accepted. Later in the article Fairbairn described his belief that the relationship between the patient and analyst was the most important factor in provoking change, in contrast to Freud, who thought that interpretation, specifically, interpretation of the transference, was the key to change. Fairbairn cites his position that people-specifically the parents of the patient- caused their child to experience frustrations that were dissociated into the child's inner world (the unconscious), and that the relationship with the analyst (the good object) could help correct the distortions that the patient brings into the consulting room, as the following two quotes demonstrate.

In terms of the object relations theory of the personality, the disabilities from which the patient suffers represent the effects of unsatisfactory and unsatisfying object-relationships experienced in early life and perpetuated in an exaggerated form in inner reality; and if this view is correct, the actual relationship existing between the patient and the analyst as persons must be regarded as in itself contributing a therapeutic factor of prime importance. The existence of such a personal relationship in outer reality not only serves the function of providing a means of correcting the distorted relationships which prevail in inner reality and influence the reactions of the patient to outer objects, but provides the patient with an opportunity, denied to him in childhood, to undergo a process of emotional development in the setting of an actual relationship with a reliable and beneficent parental figure (Fairbairn, 1958, p. 377).

It should be added that what I understand by "the relationship between the patient and analyst" is not just a relationship involved in the transference, but the total relationship existing between the patient and analyst as persons. After all, it is on the basis of the relationships existing between the individual and his parents in childhood that his personality develops and assumes its particular form: and it seems logical to infer that any subsequent change in his personality that may be effected by psycho-analytical treatment (or any other form of psychotherapy) must be effected primarily on the basis of a personal relationship (Fairbairn,1958, p. 379).

Not surprisingly, this description of psychoanalysis was totally unacceptable to his colleagues because it  simplified the process and removed much of mystery and craft from psychoanalysis, and instead saw much of the process as a "re-parenting" of the patient.  This was in line with his model in that it emphasized that psychopathology originated in the internalization of bad objects, that internalized bad objects could be released from the unconscious by the relationship with a good object, and that emotional support could restart the developmental process that was stunted in childhood. What this quote does not take into consideration are the many factors that create resistance to change within the patient's personality, which Fairbairn had cited in his prior papers, but perhaps had not been taken seriously enough here.

Fairbairn's Theory of Treatment 
As has been previously described, Fairbairn saw psychopathology as being based on the splitting of the original ego into smaller, specialized sub-egos that both minimized parental failures or, offered hope to the child in truly hopeless families. He logically assumed that mental health was based on the process of therapy being able to re-join the split off sub-egos into the central ego. For a detailed discussion of Fairbairn's theory of change see Celani (2016).

I consider that the term "analysis" as a description of psycho-analytical treatment is really a misnomer, and that the chief aim of psycho-analytical treatment is to promote a maximum of "synthesis" of the structures into which the original ego has been split, in the setting of a therapeutic relationship with the analyst. Involved with the achievement of this aim are two further aims, viz. (a) a maximum reduction of persisting infantile dependence, and (b) a maximum reduction of that hatred of the libidinal object which, according to my theory, is ultimately responsible for the original splitting of the ego (italics in the original) (Fairbairn, 1958, p. 380).

Fairbairn's model is once again consistent as the treatment goals are reversals of the origins of psychopathology. In this quote, Fairbairn sees that one of the basic "repairs" needed by patients is a reduction of their dependency, that is reversal of their developmental blocks. Actively promoting emotional growth in patients was disallowed by classical psychoanalysis as it was seen as giving in to the patients needs. Object Relations Theory has no such prohibitions, although direct help is never advocated. Rather, the therapist attention to the patient's goals and interest is often enough to restart the patient's stunted development (Celani, 2005). The second issue that Fairbairn cited is far more difficult to handle. He recognized that the patients hate of his needed mother (or father) had to be lessened if the antilibidinal ego was to give up its fight with the rejecting object. As previously mentioned, the antilibidinal ego is not generally conscious and therefore the first job of the analyst is to loosen up the material hidden in the antilibidinal ego so that it can be discussed in a new light. The "new light" is the application of adult logic to previously split off memories that were "primitive" (filled with emotion and not understood by the individual) and an acceptance of what once happened without the helpless rage and despair of a needy infant or toddler (Celani, 2010).  This occurs in the safety of the consulting room, with the support of a good object where the  patient and therapist explore  what happened to him/her,  (and often to their siblings as well) during their childhood. The approach is not designed to minimize or excuse the parent's behavior but rather to understand what happened and why it happened in the first place. Naturally, the whole process is vulnerable to derailment because of severe resistance on the part of the patient.

Resistance (for the third time), Transference, and Projection 
These three therapeutic realities are closely related. We have already discussed resistance as a product of 1) the patient's fear of discovering how bad his childhood was ("peopled by devils too frightening to face), and 2) and the resistance of the internal structures who are deeply, passionately attached to their internal crusades. There is yet a third source of resistance which results from the projection of the patient's inner templates on to external objects. Projection is the process whereby an internal part of the self is expelled and experienced by the individual as belonging to a person outside the self. The "inner template" is the patient's inner representation of one or the other of his objects. It is very common, for instance for the patient to see the therapist as if he/she were similar to the patients internalized rejecting object (Celani, 2010)  When any individual superimposes or projects his inner structures on an external object then he/she is going to mis-perceive that individual's intentions and behavior, and relate to him/her from the perspective of their long established antilibidinal ego. As has already been described the antilibidinal ego is a "specialist" in terms of arguing with and fighting off the rejecting object and it will often react in a passive-aggressive and hostile manner. Thus projection of the inner structures onto external objects is defined as transference, and this type of transference eventuates in resistance. The resistance comes from the patient's mis-perception of the therapist as a hostile opponent. Why would any patient feel comfortable and reveal material to a therapist who they mis-perceive in this way? Thus, transferences provoke more resistance, which is added to the two prior sources. Those patients with the most have richly suffused unconscious structures cannot see the therapist for who he/she is, and will display the most resistance, as the inner vision will override the weakened perceptions of the central ego.

Fairbairn was acutely aware of this as the following two quotes, clearly indicate.

The resistance on the part of the patient to the achievement of these aims (synthesis of the split off structures into the central ego, reduction of the hate in the antilibidinal ego and restarting the developmental process) is, of course, colossal; for he has a vested interest in maintaining the early split of his internalized object, upon which, according to my theory the split of his ego depends, and which represents a defense against the dilemma of ambivalence. In addition he has a vested interest in keeping his aggression internalized for the protection of his external libidinal object-with the result that his libidinal cathexis is correspondingly internalized. ...I have now come to regard as the greatest of all sources of resistance-viz.the maintenance of the patient's internal world as a closed system. In terms of the theory of the mental constitution which I have proposed, the maintenance of such a closed system involves the perpetuation of the relationships prevailing between the various ego structures and their respective internal objects, as well as between one another: and since the nature of these relationships is the ultimate source of both symptoms and deviations of character, it becomes still another aim of psycho-analytical treatment to effect breaches of the closed system, which constitutes the patient's inner world, and thus make this world accessible to the influence of outer reality (italics in the original) (Fairbairn, 1958, p. 380).

Thus, in a sense, psycho-analytical treatment resolves itself into a struggle on the part of the patient to press-gang the analyst into the closed system of the inner world through the agency of transference, and a determination oh the part of the analyst to effect a breach in this closed system and to provide conditions under which, in the setting of a therapeutic relationship, the patient may be induced to accept the open system of outer reality (italics in the original)(Fairbairn, 1958, p. 385).

These two important quotes draw together the many threads of Fairbairn's model. Note in the first quote, that he recognized that the patient has a "vested interest" in keeping his aggression internalized (in the antilibidinal ego, the part of the child's self that experienced just how bad the rejecting object was during childhood) so he can continue to keep a split off idealized vision of the same person as an exciting object. If the central ego suddenly had a clear awareness of the antilibidinal ego's experience then there would be no chance of a libidinal ego  idealization of the same parent as somehow containing hidden goodness. Splitting, as mentioned, prevents the development of ambivalence, which when achieved, allows the person to see both "sides" of the other person (good and bad) at the same time. Fairbairn sees that the therapist's goal is to develop "breeches" in the patient's sealed off inner world, so that the internalized part-selves give up their childhood quests, and the defective parents can be  understood by the maturing central ego (see Celani, 2010, pp. 85–115) for a full discussion of the process.

Resistance from Enactments During Treatment 
The second quote, states emphatically, that the therapist's main goal is to break into the patient's inner world and not allow the patient's transference to transform the therapist into one of the internalized ego structures, thus rendering him/her impotent. Whenever the patient can induce or trap the "other" with whom he/she is interacting, to engage in a similar dialogue to one that is already embedded in their inner world, the result is called an enactment. Transference is defined as one person misreading an outside person as if he/she were similar to the internalized representation of their parents. An enactment is a two person scenario in which the patient "snares" the other into taking the role that was projected on to him/her.  As previously noted, the patient may see the therapist as a new version of their internalized rejecting object, and use their antilibidinal ego to fight with him/her. This will create an impasse as the patient's  old dialogue will emerge and the actuality of, and the "goodness" of,  the therapist will not be seen.No change is possible as long as the therapist is just a new version of a preexisting internal object (or internal self).  Conversely, the patient may take the role of the rejecting object and force the therapist into a defensive antilibidinal ego position by questioning him from a position of authority . Again, no change will occur as this is an old and deeply seated scenario in the patients interior world, and because the therapist is dealing with the patient's internalized rejecting object, and not their central ego. That is, there is no discussion of which parent  behaved in this manner during their development. On the other side of the split, the patient may experience the therapist as offering promises of love and support if he/she behaves in certain ways. The unwary therapist may comply by doling out praise for certain achievements and become identical to the exciting object. Or finally, the therapist can be seduced into treating an "interesting, unusual" and very challenging patient and then fall into the role of the patient's libidinal ego, where he/she will feel loved (or experience an increase of self esteem)  if they manage to fix such a significant (exciting object) patient. Again, as long as the therapist is trapped into a role similar to those in the patient's inner world, they will be mis-perceived, and they are not reaching, or talking to, the patients central ego (for a full discussion of these issues, see Celani, 2010, pp. 84–115).

The Hysteric, Obsessional and Narcissistic Personality Disorders 
Every model is expected to be able to explain the "classic" forms of personality disorders (originally, neurotic types). Fairbairn's model uses the relational patterns embedded in the   relationships between the inner structures, when they are expressed interpersonally,  to understand  the different disorders. Celani 2001 has used Fairbairn's model to understand the clinical characteristics of the Hysterical Personality Disorder that have been known since the early writings of Freud. Celani (2007) has also written on the obsessional disorder, as well as the narcissistic personality disorder (Celani, 2014)  from the Fairbairnian/structural standpoint and has found  very different content, dynamics and relational patterns within both the inner worlds of these patients, as well as in the interpersonal expression of the structures, from individuals in these three different diagnostic groups.

The Hysterical Personality Disorder 
The dynamics of the hysterical personality have been described by Hollender in the following quote.

The mothers of [patients with] hysterical personalities are depicted as cold, preoccupied or detached, and their daughters complain of being deprived of love...When children lose hope of obtaining emotional sustenance they crave from their mothers they turn to their fathers for it. Attractive little girls soon find that coyness is effective in capturing and holding their fathers' attention. Closeness is sustained "by a subtle mutual sexual interest" (Hollender, 1971, p. 22).

Fairbairn's model predicts that the mother will be  split into rejecting object with a deeply repressed exciting components. Her exciting object component will be difficult to construct because the typical mother of a hysteric is negative (and may be in competition with her daughter for her husband's attention) and there are likely to be few tender moments for the young woman to expand into an exciting object. Her father, on the other hand, is seen as an exciting object particularly when the allure of sexuality is in the air, for instance when his daughter sings for him,  tries on a new outfit, or behaves in a seductive manner. At these times, his attention is completely focused on his daughter. The rejecting side of the hysterics father stems from the fact that his daughter has to perform to get his attention, as it is not freely given. The  problems are compounded  when the subtle  sexual relationship verges on becoming inappropriate, and then it has to be dissociated the moment the young girl feels threatened. She  is left with inner representations  of a mostly rejecting mother, and an exciting object father that has unacceptable sexual feeling associated with him which have to be  dissociated. In young adulthood, this developmental pattern can produce an individual who feels deeply deprived and worthless, as her mother was devalued by being sidestepped by her father in favor of herself (she may have won over her father,  but she is still a devalued female), and sees men as provider of nurturance and wielders of power who have to be (interpersonally) seduced to gain their attention. The result often eventuates into what has been described as the "castration scene".  When a hysteric sees a man when her libidinal ego is dominant, she will see him as an exciting object (he is exciting because he offers nurturance or has power), which she envies. She approaches him with her exaggerated femininity, which was her technique in childhood to get her father's attention. This often produces an overt sexual response in the male. The hysteric is not interested in sexuality, rather she wants to be taken care of as if she was a young child. She suddenly sees the man as a rejecting object because of his sexual response to her, and this represses her libidinal ego which is instantly replaced by her antilibidinal ego. He now appears to be identical to her father, and her antilibidinal ego emerges and it is  ready to do battle with the rejecting object. Her inner template of an exciting man who has a rejecting side based on his desire for sexuality, is confirmed once again. These repeated scenarios are called repetition compulsions, and they are engineered by the unconscious structures in the individuals inner world.

The Obsessional Personality Disorder 
The obsessional personality disorder has a very different developmental history as compared to the hysteric. Obsessionals come from families in which there is constant criticism and correction coming from the parents regarding their children's behavior. H.S. Sullivan, who originated "Interpersonal Psychoanalysis" a widely used analytic model within the group of analytic theories categorized as "Relational", wrote extensively on the obsessional disorder and the hidden cruelty in families that produce obsessional children.

No matter what aggression anyone perpetuates on another-no matter what outrages the parents perpetuate on each other, or the elder siblings perpetuate on each other, on the parents, or on little Willie-there is always some worthy principle lying about to which an appeal is made. And the fact that an appeal to an entirely contradictory principle was made 15 minutes earlier does not seem to disturb anybody (Sullivan 1956, pp. 230–231).

This style of family excuses aggression by citing "rules":  moral judgments, or "scientific" corrections with which they condemn and humiliate their children. The children  are punished for a bewildering and ever changing set of rules, which as the Sullivan quote notes, can change suddenly, and from which there is no escape. The parents are self righteous and hide their aggression by saying that they are trying to help their child better himself/herself. In addition, the children are expected to be prematurely adult and learn not to ask for  nurturance and emotional support. Many look "mature" for their age as they are good students and have serious interests, however, there is hidden damage done to  their central ego  because of  their chronic lack of a good object to love them and support their development. The child can become bewildered, as it doesn't seem possible that he/she is so bad and such a failure, as he/she is doing their very be to be "good". The rejecting object is not only veiled behind the mask of trying to help the child to better himself, but is also protected because the child has split off the many abuses into his unconscious and therefore can no longer remember them. Within these families, the child often constructs a libidinal ego based of people outside the immediate family, who represent the values that have been driven into the child, ie, perfection, purity of motive, selflessness,  and error free in judgment. The child's libidinal ego seeks love by imitating these "perfect others" whom they seek to please by imitating them and gaining their praise, (which is imagined), as they have no access to these "perfect" others. These children grow up to be dominated by their antilibidinal egos and they often reject and criticize those in positions below them, while simultaneously aspiring to achieve perfection in their chosen profession. In adulthood these individuals are often sarcastic, alienated and critical of others, frequently remaining single as they are unwilling to compromise their "standards" of perfection. They frequently become "hyper-autonomous" which means that they reject all agendas that did not originate with their needs. This is due to their history of  being  pushed around by their demanding parents  continuously in childhood (Celani, 2007).

The Narcissistic Personality Disorder 
The narcissistic personality disorder has an  unusual internal structure, as compared to the hysteric or the obsessive in that he is unable to use either parent, or an outsider who represents the parents extreme values as a exciting object, Instead, he turns to himself, and uses a part of himself as an exciting object to which his libidinal ego turns to for love and appreciation. This extreme defense is a result of a childhood so bereft  of love and caring that both parents are too toxic to idealize in any way. It is probable that the narcissist has suffered a more emotionally barren and depriving childhood than did either the hysteric or obsessive. This conclusion is reached by the fact that they use a more extreme form of defense, often called the grandiosity defense.  As mentioned, the narcissist lives in a bleak world and is often brutally criticized and rejected. Because he cannot use his parents as exciting objects, he is forced to take a part of himself and deem it to be powerful, successful and admirable. He looks up to this exciting part of himself through the eyes of his libidinal ego who is an admirer of the grandiose self (exciting object). This is not an easy relationship as the exciting object is always demanding greater and greater performances from the libidinal ego in order to get the praise it craves. This is why many narcissists work so hard on their athletic performances, seek financial success or social prominence, so their libidinal ego can bask in the praise from their exciting object.  Celani  has described a narcissistic patient who had to interrupt his treatment because he was hit by a car while crossing a street. While hospitalized, and for months afterward,  the patient reported a dream with a grandiose vision of himself.

While in the hospital he had a dream in which he saw an enormous animal, part wild stag and part bull with the iridescent plumage of a peacock around his neck, who was in pursuit of a harem of does. The stag was angered because his pursuit was interrupted by hunters who chased him and interfered with his desires. The patient said he felt extremely close to the stag, and he thought about the dream innumerable times, which brought him comfort. In Fairbairn's metapsychology, this dream restored his exciting object view of himself, while simultaneously containing a reference to the accident which interfered with his preferred view of himself (Celani, 2014, p. 397.

The fact that most narcissistic patient's  have this extreme vision of themselves, and that they experienced a toxic interpersonal history makes treatment of this diagnostic group a difficult  proposition. The narcissist has to both maintain his grandiose view of himself (who is perfect and needs no one)  and simultaneously has to avoid ever remembering the split off traumas of their childhood, as Mitchell notes in the following quote.

Based on the illusions of self-sufficiency and perfection of the grandiose self, they undercut the vary basis on which the psychoanalytic process rests, the presumption that the analysand might gain something meaningful from someone else (in this case the analyst). Despite what might be considerable psychological suffering and a genuine interest in treatment, the analysand whose character is organized around a grandiose self cannot allow the analyst to become important enough to him to really help him. The analyst and his interpretations must be continually devalued, spoiled, to avoid catapulting the patient into a condition of overpowering longing, abject dependency and intolerable hatred and envy  (Mitchell, 1986, p. 401).

The patient is not only unwilling to give up his superior-grandiose-position but his unconscious is  also populated with so many toxic memories of parental failures and neglect that the cure is not worth the additional trauma inherent in psychological exploration. Mitchell describes this second source of resistance in terms of longing for nurturance, becoming dependent on the therapist and experiencing envy of those who enjoy close and rich human relationships.

Last paper 
Fairbairn died on 31 December 1964. He fully recognized in his declining years that his model had been effectively shut out of mainstream psychoanalysis. He appears to have wanted to leave the legacy of his model in one last short paper which was published in 1963, in the International Journal of Psychoanalysis, the premier journal of psychoanalysis. His paper consists of 17 short, one sentence declarative statements that summarize his positions, all of which clashed and were incompatible with Classical Psychoanalysis. The following quote consists of the first six of the seventeen positions.

(1) An ego is present from birth.

(2) Libido is a function of the ego.

(3) There is no death instinct: and aggression is a reaction to frustration and deprivation.

(4) Since libido, is function of the ego and aggression is a reaction to frustration  or deprivation, there is no such thing as an "id"

(5) The ego, and therefore libido, is fundamentally  object seeking.

(6) The earliest and original form of anxiety, as experienced by the child, is separation anxiety  (Fairbairn, 1963, p. 225).

Fairbairn never knew, or perhaps even speculated, how important his model would be 50 years after his death. The number of publications about his model is increasing as are the applications to trauma theory, domestic abuse, hostage psychology, child development, and ultimately, public policy on the rights of children.

References

External links
 "Fairbairn's Structural Model", Richard L. Rubens, 1994.

1889 births
1964 deaths
Alumni of the University of Edinburgh
Analysands of Sigmund Freud
British Army personnel of World War I
British psychoanalysts
History of mental health in the United Kingdom
Object relations theorists
People educated at Merchiston Castle School
People in health professions from Edinburgh
Scottish psychiatrists
Scottish psychologists
Scottish soldiers
20th-century British psychologists
Burials at the Dean Cemetery